Upper Burro Creek Wilderness is a 27,440-acre (11,100 ha) wilderness area located in Yavapai and Mohave Counties in the U.S. state of Arizona, approximately 10 miles (16 km) northwest of the town of Bagdad It is managed by the Bureau of Land Management.

Topography
Upper Burro Creek is one of the few perennial streams to flow undammed into Arizona's lower desert.   of the upper portion of Burro Creek flow through the Upper Burro Creek Wilderness, which is divided into eastern and western sections by a dirt road. Away from the creek the wilderness preserves rough side canyons, and steep basalt mesas topped with desert grassland. Negro Ed Butte is a dominant feature in the area.

Wildlife
Upper Burro Creek Wilderness is home to at least 150 species of birds, including a great variety of raptors.  Among the mammals who inhabit the area are beaver, raccoon, desert cottontail, ring-tailed cat, badger, several species of skunk (spotted, striped, and hognosed), gray fox, javelina, bobcat, mountain lion, mule deer, and pronghorn.

Recreation
Common recreational activities in Upper Burro Creek Wilderness include hiking, backpacking, camping, hunting, rock collecting, horseback riding, swimming, birdwatching, and photography. There are several access routes, for example via Six Mile Crossing on the Burro Creek, itself a diverse wildlife area.

See also
 List of Arizona Wilderness Areas
 List of U.S. Wilderness Areas
 Wilderness Act

References

External links
 Upper Burro Creek Wilderness Area – Bureau of Land Management
 Upper Burro Creek Wilderness – Wilderness.net
 Upper Burro Creek Wilderness Area management plan – Bureau of Land Management

Wilderness areas of Arizona
Protected areas of Mohave County, Arizona
Protected areas of Yavapai County, Arizona
Bureau of Land Management areas in Arizona
Protected areas established in 1990
1990 establishments in Arizona